Fairwood is an unincorporated area and census-designated place (CDP) in Prince George's County, Maryland, United States. The population was 7,983 at the 2020 census.

Geography
Fairwood is located at  (38.9562, −76.7735).

Demographics

2020 census

Note: the US Census treats Hispanic/Latino as an ethnic category. This table excludes Latinos from the racial categories and assigns them to a separate category. Hispanics/Latinos can be of any race.

Education
Fairwood is in the Prince George's County Public School System.
 Elementary school: Woodmore, Glenn Dale, Whitehall, and High Bridge
 Middle school: Thomas Johnson, Samuel Ogle, and Benjamin Tasker
 High school: DuVal High School and Bowie High School

References

Census-designated places in Prince George's County, Maryland
Census-designated places in Maryland